Henry Junior Taylor (September 2, 1902 – February 24, 1984) was an American author, economist, radio broadcaster and former United States Ambassador to Switzerland (1957–1961).

Taylor was born in Chicago to Henry Noble and Eileen O'Hare Taylor. He graduated from the Lawrenceville School in 1920 and the University of Virginia in 1924. He served as a foreign correspondent for the Scripps-Howard newspaper chain in the early years of World War II. After the war, Taylor hosted the General Motors-sponsored radio program Your Land and Mine, on which he was known for his conservative commentary. Taylor was a columnist for the United Feature Syndicate after serving as Ambassador.  He authored several nonfiction books, including An American Speaks His Mind and It Must Be a Long War, and a novel, The Big Man.

In 1959, he won a Human Interest Storytelling Ernie Pyle Award from the Scripps Howard Foundation.  He is credited with introducing kabuki as a term used by American political pundits as a synonym for political posturing.

Taylor died at his home in Manhattan at the age of 81.

References

External links
Manuscript Collections - Henry J. Taylor Papers 19081984

1902 births
1983 deaths
20th-century American male writers
Ambassadors of the United States to Liechtenstein
Ambassadors of the United States to Switzerland
American columnists
American radio personalities
American reporters and correspondents
Lawrenceville School alumni
People from Manhattan
University of Virginia alumni
Writers from Chicago